Balibandha is a village located in Jhumpura Block of Kendujhar district in Odisha. The village has a population of 2391 of which 1167 are males while 1224 are females as per the Population Census 2011. Rimuli, Arsala, Chauthia, are the nearby villages to Balibandha. The PIN Code of Balibandha is 758031.

References

Villages in Kendujhar district